Aberdeen School may refer to:

International School of Aberdeen
Aberdeen School District (disambiguation)
Aberdeen High School (disambiguation)
Aberdeen International School of Canada, a school in Toronto, Ontario
Aberdeen Composite School, Aberdeen Saskatchewan; see Prairie Spirit School Division
One of the colleges or schools at University of Aberdeen, Scotland
Aberdeen Grammar School, Aberdeen, Scotland
Aberdeen School, Montreal; see Montreal West High School
Aberdeen Primary School in Hamilton, New Zealand